Craig F. Bohren (born 1940) - American atmospheric scientist and physicist. Bohren wrote fundamental books on light scattering, atmospheric thermodynamics, and radiative transfer, as well as popular science books on atmospheric optics. He is Distinguished Professor Emeritus of Meteorology at Pennsylvania State University. He is an author of about 100 articles mostly on atmospheric optics, radiative transfer, and light scattering. His first atmospheric radiation teacher was Bruce Barkstrom. He is married to Nanette Malott Bohren.

References 

American atmospheric scientists
1940 births
Living people
Pennsylvania State University faculty
Optical physicists